KHQN (1480 AM) is a spiritual radio station licensed to serve the community of Spanish Fork, Utah. The station's broadcast license is held by SACE Broadcasting Corporation.

Programming
KHQN broadcasts full-time spiritual, transcendental music and talks.

History
In 1983,  station KHQN1480 carried a Mainstream Rock format. In 1984, the station became the only stations in the United States broadcasting Hare Krishna programming full-time. 

The  Krishna Temple took over the station from the Schofield family, the previous owners. The program had consisted of news, popular and traditional music, and a call-in show for the college students and speakers as well as Spanish-speaking residents from all over Utah County. The Krishna Temple changed it to a mix of devotional & classical music & philosophical talk & drama shows.  To help in the building of the Spanish Fork Krishna Temple, Sace Broadcasting, decided to lease the station to a  Spanish Broadcaster, then the station changed to a news/talk format in 2006,  and In December 2016, KHQN was re-acquired by Krishna's SACE Broadcasting.  Now, once again, it is broadcasting Hare Krishna programming full-time.

References

Radio stations in Utah
Radio stations established in 1960
News and talk radio stations in the United States
Spanish Fork, Utah